Darkhan City FC is a Mongolian sports club based in Darkhan that fields sides in association football and futsal.

History
The club was formed in 2005. That season the men's team competed in the Mongolian Premier League, finishing fourth out of the five-team field. The were in the league again for the 2006 season, this time finishing in third place in Group A.

In 2015 Dakhan City participated in the first-ever season of the Women's National Football League. 

In 2017 the senior men's football team competed in the Mandalgovi Open Cup hosted in Mandalgovi. The club finished third in the twelve-team competition. Soyombiin Baarsuud FC, Mongoliin Temuulel FC, and FC Sumida also competed in the tournament.

The male futsal club competed in the National First League, the second tier league, for the 2017/2018 season.

Stadium
Previously the football club's home field was Darkham Central Stadium, home of the city's Nadaam. In October 2022 the team moved into its new stadium, the 1,700-seat My Mongolia Park Stadium.

References

External links
Eleven Sports channel

Football clubs in Mongolia